James Bradley (born November 7, 1955) is an American former basketball player. He played at Melrose High School in Memphis, Tennessee, where he won a Tennessee state basketball championship and went undefeated during his senior season. Bradley played one season collegiately for the Connors State Cowboys, where he was an NJCAA Honorable Mention selection in 1976, before he transferred to play for his hometown Memphis Tigers. He was a two-time first-team All-Metro selection and led the Tigers in rebounding during his final two seasons.

Bradley was selected in the 1979 NBA draft as the 35th overall pick by the Atlanta Hawks but never played in the National Basketball Association (NBA).

Career statistics

College

|-
| style="text-align:left;"| 1976–77
| style="text-align:left;"| Memphis
| 29 || – || 30.1 || .446 || – || .795 || 8.7 || 2.5 || – || – || 15.3
|-
| style="text-align:left;"| 1977–78
| style="text-align:left;"| Memphis
| 28 || – || 31.7 || .455 || – || .786 || 9.8 || – || – || – || 18.3
|-
| style="text-align:left;"| 1978–79
| style="text-align:left;"| Memphis
| 19 || – || 29.4 || .465 || – || .737 || 9.2 || 3.8 || 1.9 || 1.3 || 15.7
|- class="sortbottom"
| style="text-align:center;" colspan="2"| Career
| 76 || – || 30.5 || .454 || – || .777 || 9.2 || – || – || – || 16.5

References

External links
College statistics
Italian league stats

1955 births
Living people
African-American basketball players
American expatriate basketball people in Italy
American men's basketball players
Atlanta Hawks draft picks
Basketball players from Memphis, Tennessee
Connors State Cowboys basketball players
Memphis Tigers men's basketball players
Power forwards (basketball)
Small forwards
21st-century African-American people
20th-century African-American sportspeople